The 2006 Grand National (officially known as the John Smith's Grand National for sponsorship reasons) was the 159th official annual running of the Grand National steeplechase which took place at Aintree near Liverpool, England, on 8 April 2006 and attracted the maximum permitted field of forty competitors for total prize money of £689,360 including £399,140 to the winner.

11–1 Irish shot Numbersixvalverde, ridden by Niall Madden, won the race, ahead of 5–1 joint-favourite and the previous year's winner Hedgehunter in second place. The other joint-favourite, Clan Royal, was deemed third in a photo finish ahead of Nil Desperandum at 33–1. Nine of the forty runners completed the course, the fewest since 2001.

Runners and betting
Clan Royal was the long-time ante-post favourite with the public on the back of finishing second in 2004 and being carried out while leading in 2005, as well as being partnered with champion jockey Tony McCoy. But significant money on race day went on the 2005 winner Hedgehunter who was again to be partnered by Ruby Walsh. The pair went off as joint-favourites while other popular choices among the public were Racing Post Chase winner Innox from France, Garvivonnian, the winner of the Becher Chase over one circuit of the National course five months earlier, 2005 Betfred Gold Cup winner Jack High, 2005 Irish Grand National winner Numbersixvalverde, and the grey Ross Comm, considered to have been underestimated in the handicap by 10 lbs.

The race
There was one false start when Ross Comm tried to bite the tape as it went to rise. The runners were recalled and got away at the second attempt despite the calls from Conor O'Dwyer that his mount Native Upmanship was not ready, being left twenty lengths adrift at the start. Shotgun Willy led over the first fence which claimed Juveigneur, Whispered Secret, Tyneandthyneagain, last year's runner up Royal Auclair and the highly fancied Innox, while the fences leading to the sixth, Becher's Brook, also ended the hopes of Baron Windrush at the third, Ross Comm at the fourth and Ebony Light at the fifth, with Just in Debt failing to negotiate the famous sixth.

Shotgun Willy was headed at the Canal Turn by the tighter jump of Ballycassidy but it was Puntal who moved to the front at the ninth (Valentine's) and led the field back to the racecourse minus Le Duc who had unseated his rider back at the Turn.

Thirty of the original forty starters continued onto the racecourse to The Chair, where Jack High, Silver Birch and Heros Collonges all came to grief. Garvivonnian also blundered there and was pulled up before taking the next, the Water Jump, which marks the end of the first circuit.

Ballycassidy and Puntal had enjoyed a lead of about six lengths on the first circuit but the former began to draw away from the latter and the rest of the field on the run to Becher's for the second time. Behind, Lord of Illusion, Iris Royal, Shotgun Willy, Cornish Rebel, Le Roi Miguel, Direct Access and Amberleigh House all pulled up with Haut De Gamme falling at the 20th fence.

Becher's itself claimed tail-ender Sir Oj and the Foinavon fence saw the tiring First Gold unseat his rider, to leave sixteen runners still in the contest as the field turned at the Canal for the second time.

Ballycassidy still led by four lengths at this point, with only the struggling Rince Ri and Iznogoud too far behind to challenge.

The leader hesitated at Valentine's however and fell to leave Hedgehunter leading the still tightly-packed survivors back towards the finish while behind him the 27th fence was far enough for Native Upmanship and Rince Ri who both refused after seeing Therealbandit, Iznogoud and Colonel Rayburn all pulled up. It Takes Time also called it a day after taking the third-last flight to leave nine runners still in the race.

The long run towards the second-last fence paid for Joe's Edge and Forest Gunner, while Hedgehunter, Clan Royal and Numbersixvalverde jumped abreast with their three rivals still tucked in behind. Inca Trail and Risk Accessor were both beaten by the last fence which Numbersixvalverde jumped just ahead of Hedgehunter and Clan Royal, with Nil Desperandum still in touch in fourth.

Numbersixvalverde was now pushed out to take the run-in, and reached the elbow  lengths up on Hedgehunter with equal distances to Nil Desperandum and Clan Royal. From there on the leader increased his advantage over the other three to win by six lengths. Hedgehunter came in second and Clan Royal was given third in a photo finish ahead of Nil Desperandum in fourth.

Finishing order

Non-finishers

Aftermath
Winning jockey Niall 'Slippers' Madden said that he had been given a dream ride all the way but was not actually sure he had won until he crossed the line, despite believing that he would win a long way from home. The second, Ruby Walsh, third, Tony McCoy and fourth, Tom Treacy, riders all agreed that the rain the previous day had gone against their runners, despite all believing that they would win crossing the Melling Road to turn for the second last flight. Fifth-placed Noel Fehily also believed he was going to win on Risk Accessor crossing the Melling Road but confessed that his mount did not get the trip. Barry Geraghty felt that Puntal's chance went when hitting the 20th fence very hard, which winded him slightly before rallying to pick up stragglers late on. The other three riders to complete the course were all delighted to complete the race, while each stated that their mounts were well beaten by two fences out.

Of those that did not complete the course only one rider, Tony Dobbin, pulled up because the horse, Direct Access, was not enjoying it, while Jason Maguire was forced to pull up Lord of Illusion when the horse bled. J. P. McNamara felt he was unlucky to be unseated from Heros Collonges at The Chair because his horse was baulked while Andrew McNamara confessed that Rince Ri was stopped by a loose horse falling into the ditch in front of him rather than actually refusing. Leighton Aspell was the only rider to exit the race while lying in the first half dozen when long-time leader Ballycassidy fell but he stopped short of saying that he felt they would win, merely feeling that they deserved to get round after their front running performance.

Tyneandthyneagain continued riderless after falling at the first fence until he fell into the open ditch along the canal side. Upon being returned to the stables he was found to have a serious spinal injury and was  euthanised. 2004 winner Amberleigh House was retired after the race.

Stephen Craine was taken to hospital with a broken collarbone after his fall from Ebony Light, while Paul Carberry suffered a sprained ankle after his fall from Sir Oj.

Media coverage
The race was broadcast live on BBC television and radio. The television coverage was as a Grandstand special for the 47th consecutive year. Although BBC television would continue to air the race until 2012 this year's would end up being the final National in Grandstand as the programme would finish in January 2007. The televising of the race included cameras inside the first fence and three inside jockey's caps (Christian Williams on Royal Auclair, Leighton Aspell on Ballycassidy and Sam Thomas on Silver Birch). The programme was presented by Sue Barker and Clare Balding with summary from Richard Pitman, Peter Scudamore and Norman Williamson. John Parrott and Rishi Persad interviewed spectators and celebrity racegoers on course with Angus Loughran reviewing the betting market. The race commentary team was Ian Bartlett, Tony O'Hehir, Darren Owen and lead commentator Jim McGrath who called the runners home for the ninth year.

Prior to the race, nineteen leading racing correspondents were asked to pick their top four. Only one, the BBC website's 'Honest Frank' correctly predicted the winner.

Jockeys
For the sixth consecutive year, Carl Llewellyn was the senior citizen of the weighing room, becoming only the sixth rider to weigh out for his 16th Grand National, including the void race of 1993 in which he took part. Llewellyn retired before the end of the year though he did briefly consider returning for a 17th crack at the race in 2008.

Seven riders made their debut including Niall Madden who became the twenty-first rider to win the race at the first attempt as well as the first in the 21st century. Nina Carberry also completed the course while Stephen Craine, Sam Thomas, Liam Heard, Andrew McNamara and Keith Mercer all failed to reach the finishing post.

References

Official BBC coverage of the 2006 Grand National

Grand National
 2006
Grand National
21st century in Merseyside
Grand National
Grand